Enis Bešlagić (born 6 January 1975) is a Bosnian actor. In the 2000s, he starred in several films such as Fuse (2003), Summer in the Golden Valley (2003), Ivko's Feast (2005), Ram za sliku moje domovine (2005) and All for Free (2006). He starred in the sitcom Naša mala klinika from 2004 until 2007. Bešlagić and Bosnian actor Milan Pavlović portrayed the comedy duo Mujo and Haso in the 2004 skit-comedy film Mujo & Haso Superstars.

He appeared in Bosnian television series Lud, zbunjen, normalan and Viza za budućnost, as well as series in neighboring Croatia such as Naša mala klinika , Odmori se, zaslužio si and Cimmer fraj. Bešlagić portrayed Miron Firdus in the Federalna televizija comedy series Kriza for the first two seasons (2013–14) and has been a judge on the Croatian televised singing competition Zvjezdice since 2015.

Early life
Enis Bešlagić was born in the northern Bosnian city of Doboj on 6 January 1975 while Bosnia was part of Yugoslavia. When the Bosnian War broke out in April 1992, 17-year-old Bešlagić escaped from his native town Tešanj to his aunts home in Germany. He was soon employed as a janitor for three months before working at a Munich cemetery as a gravedigger.

His paternal grandfather was Rešad Bešlagić, a folk singer popular in the era of the Kingdom of Yugoslavia. He was killed in 1945 during World War II in Sarajevo.

Career
Bešlagić joined Alka Vuica, Luka Nižetić, and Vanna the judges panel of the Croatian children's televised singing competition Zvjezdice in September 2015 on RTL Television.

Personal life
Enis is married to Sabina Bešlagić. They have two children; a daughter Asja and a son Mak. He is a fan of TOŠK Tešanj.

Filmography

Films
Fuse (2003)
Summer in the Golden Valley (2003)
Days and Hours (2004)
Mujo i Haso Superstars (2004)
Ram za sliku moje domovine (2005)
Ivko's Feast (2005)
All for Free (2006)
Armin (2007)
Duhovi Sarajeva (2007)
Montevideo, God Bless You! (2010)
Sabina K. (2015)
Our Everyday Life (2015)

Television
Warriors (1999; TV film)
Nepitani (1999; TV film)
Viza za budućnost (2003–08; 118 episodes)
Crna hronika (2004; 1 episode)
Super Billy (2004–07; animated series)
Naša mala klinika (2004–07; 112 episodes)
Gori vatra (2005; 1 episode)
Sex i selo (2005; 1 episode)
Praonica (2005; 1 episode)
Lud, zbunjen, normalan (2007); 2 episodes)
Cimmer fraj (2006–07; 64 episodes)
Žene sa broja 13 (2009; 1 episode)
Dva smo svijeta različita (2011; 1 episode)
Stipe u gostima (2011; 1 episode)
Montevideo, Bog te video! (2012–13; 4 episodes)
Odmori se, zaslužio si (2013; 18 episodes)
Kriza (2013–14; 24 episodes)
Zvjezdice (2015–present)

Short films
Sindrom (1998)
Čudan pazar (2000)
10 Minutes (2002)
Ram za sliku moje domovine (2005)

External links

References

External links

1975 births
Living people
People from Doboj
Bosniaks of Bosnia and Herzegovina
Bosnia and Herzegovina male actors
Naturalized citizens of Croatia
Bosniaks of Croatia
Bosnian expatriate actors in Croatia